Jyotirao Govindrao Phule (11 April 1827 – 28 November 1890) was an Indian social activist, thinker, anti-caste social reformer and writer from Maharashtra. His work extended to many fields, including eradication of untouchability and the caste system and for his efforts in educating women and oppressed caste people. He and his wife, Savitribai Phule, were pioneers of women's education in India. Phule started his first school for girls in 1848 in Pune at Tatyasaheb Bhide's residence or Bhidewada. He, along with his followers, formed the Satyashodhak Samaj (Society of Truth Seekers) to attain equal rights for people from lower castes. People from all religions and castes could become a part of this association which worked for the upliftment of the oppressed classes. Phule is regarded as an important figure in the social reform movement in Maharashtra.The honorific Mahātmā (Sanskrit: "great-souled", "venerable"), was first applied to him in 1888 at a special program honoring him in Mumbai..

Early life
Jyotirao Phule was born in Pune in 1827 to a family that belonged to the Mali caste. The Malis traditionally worked as fruit and vegetable growers: in the four-fold varna system of caste hierarchy, they were placed within the Shudras. Phule was named after God Jyotiba. He was born on the day of Jyotiba's annual fair. Phule's family, previously named Gorhe, had its origins in the village of Katgun, near the town of Satara. There, his only son, Shetiba, brought the family into poverty. The family, including three sons, moved to Poona seeking employment. The boys were taken under the wing of a florist who taught them the secrets of the trade. Their proficiency in growing and arranging became well known and they adopted the name Phule (flower-man) in place of Gorhe. Their fulfillment of commissions from the Peshwa, Baji Rao II, for flower mattresses and other goods for the rituals and ceremonies of the royal court so impressed him that he granted them  of land on the basis of the inam system, whereby no tax would be payable upon it. The oldest brother machinated to take sole control of the property, leaving the younger two siblings, Jyotirao Phule's father, Govindrao, to continue farming and also flower-selling.

Govindrao married Chimnabai and had two sons, of whom Jyotirao was the youngest. Chimnabai died before he was aged one. The Mali community did not make room for much by education, and after attending primary school to learn the basics of reading, writing, and arithmetic, Jyotirao was withdrawn from school. He joined the menfolk of his family at work, both in the shop and the farm. However, a man from the same Mali caste as Phule recognised his intelligence and persuaded Phule's father to allow Phule to attend the local Scottish Mission High School. Phule completed his English schooling in 1847. As was customary, he was married young, at the age of 13, to a girl of his own community, chosen by his father.

The turning point in his life was in 1848, when he attended the wedding of a Brahmin friend. Phule participated in the customary marriage procession, but was later rebuked and insulted by his friend's parents for doing that. They told him that he being from a Shudra caste should have had the sense to keep away from that ceremony. This incident profoundly affected Phule on the injustice of the caste system.

Social activism

Education

In 1848, aged 21, Phule visited a girls' school in Ahmednagar run by Christian missionaries Cynthia Farrar. It was also in 1848 that he read Thomas Paine's book Rights of Man and developed a keen sense of social justice. He realized that exploited castes and women were at a disadvantage in Indian society, and also that education of these sections was vital to their emancipation. To this end and in the same year, Phule first taught reading and writing to his wife, Savitribai, and then the couple started the first indigenously run school for girls in Pune. He also taught his sister Sagunabai Kshirsagar (his maternal aunt's daughter) to write Marathi with Savitribai. The conservative upper caste society of Pune didn't approve of his work. But many Indians and Europeans helped him generously. Conservatives in Pune also forced his own family and community to ostracize them. During this period, their friend Usman Sheikh and his sister Fatima Sheikh provided them with shelter. They also helped to start the school on their premises. Later, the Phules started schools for children from the then untouchable castes such as Mahar and Mang. In 1852, there were three Phule schools in operation 273 girls were pursuing education in these school but by 1858 they had all closed. Eleanor Zelliot blames the closure on private European donations drying up due to the Indian Mutiny of 1857, withdrawal of government support, and Jyotirao resigning from the school management committee because of disagreement regarding the curriculum.

Women's welfare
Phule watched how untouchables were not permitted to pollute anyone with their shadows and that they had to attach a broom to their backs to wipe the path on which they had traveled. He saw young widows shaving their heads, refraining from any sort of joy in their life. He saw how untouchable women had been forced to dance naked. He made the decision to educate women by witnessing all these social evils that encouraged unequality. He began with his wife, every afternoon, Jyotirao sat with his wife Savitribai Phule and educated her when she went to the farms where he worked, to bring him his meal. He sent his wife to get trained at a school. The husband and wife set up India's first girls' school in Vishrambag Wada, Pune, in 1848.

He championed widow remarriage and started a home for dominant caste pregnant widows to give birth in a safe and secure place in 1863. His orphanage was established in an attempt to reduce the rate of infanticide.

In 1863, Pune witnessed a horrific incident. A Brahmin widow named Kashibai got pregnant and her attempts at abortion didn't succeed. She killed the baby after giving it birth and threw it in a well, but her act came to light. She had to face punishment and was sentenced to jail. This incident greatly upset Phule and hence, along with his longtime friend Sadashiv Ballal Govande and Savitribai, he started an infanticide prevention centre. Pamphlets were stuck around Pune advertising the centre in the following words: "Widows, come here and deliver your baby safely and secretly. It is up to your discretion whether you want to keep the baby in the centre or take it with you. This orphanage will take care of the children [left behind]." The Phule couple ran the infanticide prevention centre until the mid-1880s.

Phule tried to eliminate the stigma of social untouchability surrounding the exploited castes by opening his house and the use of his water well to the members of the exploited castes.

Views on religion and caste
Phule appealed for restablishment of the reign of mythical Mahabali (King Bali) which predated "Aryans' treacherous coup d'etat". He proposed his own version of Aryan invasion theory that the Aryan conquerors of India, whom the theory's proponents considered to be racially superior, were in fact barbaric suppressors of the indigenous people. He believed that they had instituted the caste system as a framework for subjugation and social division that ensured the pre-eminence of their Brahmin successors. He saw the subsequent Muslim conquests of the Indian subcontinent as more of the same sort of thing, being a repressive alien regime, but took heart in the arrival of the British, whom he considered to be relatively enlightened and not supportive of the varnashramadharma system instigated and then perpetuated by those previous invaders. In his book, Gulamgiri, he thanked Christian missionaries and the British colonists for making the exploited castes realise that they are worthy of all human rights. The book, whose title transliterates as slavery and which concerned women, caste and reform, was dedicated to the people in the US who were working to end slavery.

Phule saw Vishnu's avatars as a symbol of oppression stemming from the Aryan conquests and took Mahabali (Bali Raja) as hero. His critique of the caste system began with an attack on the Vedas, the most fundamental texts of Hindus. He considered them to be a form of false consciousness.

He is credited with introducing the Marathi word dalit (broken, crushed) as a descriptor for those people who were outside the traditional varna system.

At an education commission hearing in 1882, Phule called for help in providing education for lower castes. To implement it, he advocated making primary education compulsory in villages. He also asked for special incentives to get more lower-caste people in high schools and colleges.

Satyashodhak Samaj
On 24 September 1874, Phule formed Satyashodhak Samaj to focus on rights of depressed groups such women, the Shudra, and the Dalit. Through this samaj, he opposed idolatry and denounced the caste system. Satyashodhak Samaj campaigned for the spread of rational thinking and rejected the need for priests.

Phule established Satyashodhak Samaj with the ideals of human well-being, happiness, unity, equality, and easy religious principles and rituals. A Pune-based newspaper, Deenbandhu, provided the voice for the views of the Samaj.

The membership of the samaj included Muslims, Brahmins and government officials. Phule's own Mali caste provided the leading members and financial supporters for the organization.

Occupation

Apart from his role as a social activist, Phule was a businessman too. In 1882 he styled himself as a merchant, cultivator and municipal contractor. He owned  of farmland at Manjri, near Pune. For period of time, he worked as a contractor for the government and supplied building materials required for the construction of a dam on the Mula-Mutha river near Pune in the 1870s. He also received contracts to provide labour for the construction of the Katraj Tunnel and the Yerawda Jail near Pune. One of Phule's businesses, established in 1863, was to supply metal-casting equipment.

Phule was appointed commissioner (municipal council member) to the then Poona municipality in 1876 and served in this unelected position until 1883.

Published works
Phule's akhandas were organically linked to the abhangs of Marathi Varkari saint Tukaram. Among his notable published works are:

Tritiya Ratna, 1855
Brahmananche Kasab, 1869
Powada : Chatrapati Shivajiraje Bhosle Yancha, [English: Life Of Shivaji, In Poetical Metre], June 1869
Powada: Vidyakhatyatil Brahman Pantoji, June 1869
Manav Mahammand (Muhammad) (Abhang)
Gulamgiri, 1873
Shetkarayacha Aasud (Cultivator's Whipcord), July 1881
Satsar Ank 1, June 1885
Satsar Ank 2 June 1885
Ishara, October 1885
Gramjoshya sambhandi jahir kabhar, (1886)
Satyashodhak Samajokt Mangalashtakasah Sarva Puja-vidhi, 1887
Sarvajanik Satya Dharma Poostak, April 1889
Sarvajanic Satya Dharmapustak, 1891
Akhandadi Kavyarachana
Asprushyanchi Kaifiyat

Legacy

According to Dhananjay Keer, Phule was bestowed with the title of Mahatma on 11 May 1888 by another social reformer from Bombay, Vithalrao Krishnaji Vandekar.

 

Indian Postal Department issued a postage stamp in year 1977 in the honour of Phule.

An early biography of Phule was the Marathi-language Mahatma Jotirao Phule Yanche Charitra (P. S. Patil, Chikali: 1927). Two others are Mahatma Phule. Caritra Va Kriya (Mahatma Phule. Life and Work) (A. K. Ghorpade, Poona: 1953), which is also in Marathi, and Mahatma Jyotibha Phule: Father of Our Social Revolution (Dhananjay Keer, Bombay: 1974). Unpublished material relating to him is held by the Bombay State Committee on the History of the Freedom Movement.

Phule's work inspired B. R. Ambedkar, the first minister of law of India and the chief of Indian constitution's drafting committee. Ambedkar had acknowledged Phule as one of his three gurus or masters.

There are many structures and places commemorating Phule. These include:
 The full-length statue inaugurated at the premises of Vidhan Bhavan (Assembly Building of Maharashtra State)
 Mahatma Jyotiba Phule Mandai, formerly known as Crawford Market, in Mumbai
 Mahatma Phule Museum in Pune
 Mahatma Phule Krishi Vidyapeeth (Agricultural University) in Rahuri, Ahmednagar District, Maharashtra
 Mahathma Phule Mandai, the biggest vegetable market in Pune
 Mahatma Jyotiba Phule Rohilkhand University
 Subharti College of Physiotherapy was formerly named after him.

In popular culture 
 G. P. Deshpande's biographical play Satyashodhak (The Truth Seeker) was first performed by Jan Natya Manch in 1992.
 Mahatma Phule (1954), an Indian Marathi-language biographical film about the social reformer was directed Pralhad Keshav Atre.
Krantijyoti Savitribai Phule, an Indian drama television series based on Savitribai Phule's and Jyotiba Phule's life was aired on DD National in 2016.
Savitri Jyoti, an Marathi drama television series based on the life and work of Savitribai and Jyotiba Phule was aired on Sony Marathi in 2019- 2020.
Savitribai Phule, an Indian Kannada-language biopic was made about Phule in 2018.

References
Notes

Citations

Bibliography

Further reading

External links

 
1827 births
1890 deaths
Activists from Maharashtra
Marathi people
Marathi-language writers
Women's education in India
Satyashodhak Samaj
People from Satara district
19th-century Indian educational theorists
Scholars from Maharashtra
Writers from Maharashtra
Dalit activists
Indian social reformers
Indian revolutionaries
Anti-caste movements
19th-century Indian historians
Social justice
Founders of Indian schools and colleges
Anti-caste activists